Mru or Mro may refer to:

Mru people, also known as Mro, Murong, Taung Mro, Mrung, or Mrucha, a tribal people of Myanmar, Bangladesh, and India
Mru language or Mrung, a Sino-Tibetan language of the Mru / Mrucha people
Mro (Unicode block), a Unicode block containing characters used in the Mru / Mrung language
Mro-Khimi people, also known as Mro, Awa Khami Mro, Wakim, Mro Chin or Awa Khami, a Chin people of Myanmar
Mro-Khimi language, also known as Mro, Mro Wakim or Mro Chin, the Kuki-Chin language of the Mro-Khimi people

See also
MRU (disambiguation)
MRO (disambiguation)